Presidential elections were held in Mexico on 17 November 1929. The winner of these elections was to serve the remainder of the 1928–1934 term for which Álvaro Obregón had been elected to the previous year before his assassination.

The National Revolutionary Party, founded in 1928 by Mexico's most powerful leader at the time, Plutarco Elías Calles, made its debut in these elections. The 1929 elections marked the beginning of 71 uninterrupted years of rule by that party, which was later renamed Party of the Mexican Revolution in 1938 and finally, Institutional Revolutionary Party (PRI) in 1946. No opposition party would win a Presidential election until the 2000 elections.

According to the official results, the elections were won by Pascual Ortiz Rubio, who received 93.6% of the vote.  Opposition candidate José Vasconcelos claimed that the elections had been fraudulent and unsuccessfully tried to organize an armed revolt to take power.

Ortiz Rubio was not able to serve the remainder of Álvaro Obregón's term as he was supposed to, as he resigned in September 1932 due to differences with Calles. Abelardo L. Rodríguez served the remaining two years of the term.

Results

President

Aftermath
The opposition candidate José Vasconcelos refused to recognize the official results, claiming that a massive electoral fraud had taken place, and proclaimed his "Plan de Guaymas", urging the Mexican people to rebel against the alleged fraud. He was subsequently jailed, and after being released he moved to the United States.

Many modern analysts, such as Enrique Krauze, have arrived at the conclusion that the 1929 elections were indeed rigged and Ortiz Rubio probably lost the election. In subsequent decades, the National Revolutionary Party, later renamed Institutional Revolutionary Party, continued resorting to electoral fraud to perpetuate itself in power.

References

Presidential elections in Mexico
Mexico
General
November 1929 events
Election and referendum articles with incomplete results